Captive Women is a 1952 American black-and-white post-apocalyptic science-fiction film. It stars Robert Clarke and Margaret Field. The film has a running  time of 64 minutes. It deals with the effects of a nuclear war and how life would be afterwards.

In the United Kingdom the film is known as 3000 A.D., the film's original title.

Plot
The film opens with war footage from World War III ending with a nuclear attack.

Long after the nuclear war, the last human survivors are divided into three tribes. Robert (Clarke) and Ruth (Field) are about to be married in the ruins of a post-apocalyptic New York City during a brief interlude in ongoing hostilities between their tribe (the Norms) and the rival tribe (the Mutates). The Mutates try to adhere to the tenets of the Christian Bible, but it is rejected by the Norms.

However, raiders from a third tribe, the Upriver People, attack through the Hudson River Tunnel and capture Ruth and several other women because they desperately need fertile females. The warring tribes must put aside their differences to rescue the women, a joint effort that unfolds quite quickly in the short film.

Ultimately, the Upriver People are defeated and are trapped in the tunnel as it is flooded. The women are recovered, and there are improved prospects for more peaceful relations among the tribes as the film concludes.

Cast
 Robert Clarke as Robert
 Margaret Field as Ruth
 Gloria Saunders as Catherine
 Ron Randell as Riddon
 William Schallert as Carver

Production
Jack Pollexfen and Aubrey Wisberg had a deal to make three films at RKO: Captive Women, Sword of Venus and Port Sinister. Albert Zugsmith became involved as an associate producer, taking 25% against Pollexfen and Wisberg's 75%.

Pollexfen later said "our main problem in Captive Women was that we were battling Zugsmith too much to pay attention to the production". He says also that Howard Hughes, who then owned RKO, insisted the film be directed by Stewart Gilmore, who had been one of Hughes' leading editors, including on The Outlaw.

Filming started 9 July 1951. Robert Clarke recalled that Gilmore:
He was lost. Completely. The poor man had  tremendous problems; there were too many people in the cast, too many actors with no dialogue in the scenes , 
and the fact that they had over-extended themselves for special effects...The whole film was ineffectual. Pollexfen and Wisberg were trying to make a better picture— sometimes, Hollywood thinks that if you spend more money, you make a better picture. Well, this is one instance where that didn’t happen. Gilmore was in over his  head — he didn’t know directing, and l don’t think he ever did another picture because he got a bad taste in his mouth from this one. 
William Schallert recalls that the film was rewritten during the shoot and actors had to constantly learn new parts.

Pollexfen says the budget was around $85,000 of which he and his partner received a fee of $15,000 and Zugsmith was paid $2,500.

At one stage the film was known as 3000 AD. Another original title was found 1,000 Years from Now, but RKO wanted a more sensational title.

The ruins of New York are briefly shown in matte paintings by Block. In 1956, it was re-released by the name 1000 Years from Now.

It was one of three films Albert Zugsmith made for RKO. It was Ron Randell's first science fiction film.

Reception
Variety found the movie's plot to be plodding, with most of the good ideas left off screen, but the camera work was good, as was Ron Randall's acting.

The Encyclopedia of Science Fiction found the movie of some importance as perhaps the first science fiction film to consider what the world might become some time after a nuclear war. TV Guide found that the movie was often inane and silly but that the halfway-decent visual effects helped the shaky film.

References

External links
 
Captive Women at BFI
Captive Women at TCMDB
Captive Women at Letterbox DVD

1952 films
1950s science fiction films
Films about nuclear war and weapons
American science fiction films
Films set in New York City
Films set in the 31st century
American post-apocalyptic films
American black-and-white films
RKO Pictures films
Films produced by Aubrey Wisberg
Films about World War III
Films with screenplays by Aubrey Wisberg
1950s English-language films
1950s American films